John Smith was an Irish Anglican priest in Ireland in the seventeenth century.

A native of Athboy, he was educated at Trinity College, Dublin. He became the Rector of  Inniskeen in 1635. He was Archdeacon of Ardfert from 1664 to 1666  when he became Dean of Limerick.  He was appointed to the episcopate as  Bishop of Killala and Achonry in 1679 but died the following year on 7 March.

References

Archdeacons of Ardfert
Deans of Limerick
Bishops of Killala and Achonry
Alumni of Trinity College Dublin
People from Wells, Somerset
1680 deaths
Year of birth missing